McAllister Field  (known for the Yakima Air Terminal) is a public airport three miles south of Yakima, in Yakima County, Washington. Owned by the City of Yakima, it is used for general aviation and commercial air service. Yakima is served by one scheduled passenger air carrier (Alaska Airlines with service to Seattle/Tacoma International Airport) and two non-scheduled carriers (Sun Country Airlines and Xtra Airways). Sun Country Airlines operates charter flights to Laughlin, NV and Xtra Airways operates charter flights to Wendover, NV.

This airport is in the National Plan of Integrated Airport Systems for 2011–2015, which called it as a primary commercial service airport. Federal Aviation Administration records say the airport had 57,076 passenger boardings (enplanements) in calendar year 2014, 60,028 in 2009 and 53,832 in 2010.

History
During World War II the airfield was used by the United States Army Air Forces.

Historical airline service

Northwest Airlines was serving the airport in 1939 with a daily roundtrip Portland, OR - Yakima - Spokane flight operated with a Douglas DC-3. By the early and mid 1960s, Northwest was operating daily, no change of plane Lockheed L-188 Electra propjet service from Yakima to the U.S. east coast via a number of intermediate stops as well as nonstop Electra service to Seattle/Tacoma International Airport (SEA), Portland (PDX) and Spokane (GEG).  In early 1962, Northwest was operating a daily eastbound Seattle - Yakima - Spokane - Great Falls, MT - Billings, MT - Bismarck, ND - Minneapolis/St. Paul - Milwaukee - Detroit - New York City (via Newark Airport) flight with an Electra.  By late 1965, Northwest was operating a daily eastbound Seattle - Yakima - Spokane - Missoula, MT - Helena, MT - Butte, MT - Bozeman, MT - Billings - Fargo, ND - Minneapolis/St. Paul - Washington D.C. National Airport flight also with an Electra.  Northwest was continuing to serve the airport in early 1966 with daily nonstop Electra propjet service to Seattle/Tacoma, Portland, OR and Spokane as well as direct, no change of plane Electra service to Billings, Minneapolis/St. Paul, Washington, D.C. and other destinations; however, the airline was no longer serving Yakima by late 1966.

West Coast Airlines was serving Yakima in 1954 with nine daily Douglas DC-3 departures from the airport with flights to Seattle Boeing Field (BFI), Portland, OR, Spokane, Baker, OR, Coeur d'Alene, ID, Ellensburg, WA, Ephrata, WA, La Grande, OR, Lewiston, ID, Ontario, OR, Pasco, WA, Pendleton, OR, Pullman, WA and Walla Walla, WA.  By the spring of 1968, West Coast was operating Douglas DC-9-10 jet service nonstop from the airport to Seattle Boeing Field, Portland and Pasco as well as direct, no change of plane DC-9 jet flights to San Francisco (SFO), Spokane, Eugene and Medford in addition to flying Fairchild F-27 turboprop service to a number of regional destinations.

West Coast Airlines then merged with Bonanza Air Lines and Pacific Air Lines to form Air West which was subsequently renamed Hughes Airwest.
In the summer of 1968, Air West was operating Douglas DC-9-10 and McDonnell Douglas DC-9-30 jet service from the airport nonstop to Portland, OR and Pasco as well as direct DC-9 service to San Francisco (SFO), Spokane, Eugene, Medford, San Jose, CA, Fresno and Las Vegas in addition to nonstop Fairchild F-27 turboprop flights to Seattle Boeing Field (BFI) with nonstop and direct F-27 service to other regional destinations.  In 1975, Hughes Airwest was operating all of its flights from the airport with Douglas DC-9-10 and McDonnell Douglas DC-9-30 jets with nonstop service to Seattle/Tacoma International Airport (SEA) and Pasco in addition to direct, no change of plane DC-9 jet flights to Los Angeles (LAX), Orange County Airport near Santa Ana, CA, Salt Lake City, Phoenix, Tucson, Portland, OR, Santa Maria, CA and Eugene and was also operating direct, no change of plane DC-9 service to two international destinations:  Guadalajara, Mexico and Mazatlan, Mexico. Also in 1975, Cascade Airways, a commuter air carrier, was operating nonstop Beechcraft 99 turboprop flights to Yakima from Seattle/Tacoma, Portland, OR, Spokane, Pullman, WA and Wenatchee, WA.

Hughes Airwest was then acquired by and merged into Republic Airlines in 1980.  In late 1980, Republic was operating McDonnell Douglas DC-9-30 jet service from the airport nonstop to Seattle/Tacoma and Pasco as well as direct, no change of plane DC-9-30 jet flights to San Francisco, Los Angeles, Denver, Boise and Eugene.  However, by the summer of 1982 Republic was no longer serving Yakima.

Horizon Air began serving the airport on September 1, 1981, as a new independent regional air carrier with nonstop Fairchild F-27 turboprop service to Seattle/Tacoma (SEA) with Yakima being the first destination served by Horizon.  By early 1985 Horizon Air was operating F-27 turboprops as well as smaller Fairchild Swearingen Metroliner propjets into the airport with nonstop flights from Seattle/Tacoma, Portland, OR, Pasco and Pullman while Cascade Airways was operating its flights with Beechcraft 1900C and larger Hawker Siddeley HS 748 turboprops with nonstop service from Seattle/Tacoma, Portland, OR, Spokane, Lewiston, ID, Moses Lake, WA, Pasco, Pullman, WA and Walla Walla, WA. According to the Official Airline Guide (OAG), Cascade and Horizon were operating a combined total of thirteen nonstop flights a day on weekdays from Seattle/Tacoma to Yakima in February 1985.  Horizon Air was then acquired by Alaska Airlines in November 1986 as a wholly owned subsidiary and continues to currently serve Yakima with Alaska Airlines branded service.

Jet service had returned to Yakima by early 1988 when Pacific Southwest Airlines (PSA) was operating twice daily direct service to San Francisco with both flights making an intermediate stop in Pasco with one of these flights then continuing on from SFO to Orange County Airport in southern California.  That same year, PSA was acquired by and merged into USAir which in late 1988
was operating McDonnell Douglas MD-80 jetliners twice a day nonstop from Seattle/Tacoma with both of these flights originating in San Francisco with twice daily jet service from SFO to Yakima thus being flown on a direct one stop basis.  At this same time, both Horizon Air (operating code sharing service on behalf of Alaska Airlines) and United Express (operated by North Pacific Airlines on a code sharing basis on behalf of United Airlines) were also operating nonstop flights from Seattle/Tacoma to the airport, Horizon Air with de Havilland Canada DHC-8 Dash 8 and Fairchild Swearingen Metroliner propjets, and United Express with British Aerospace BAe Jetstream 31 propjets with both air carriers also operating nonstop service from Portland, OR to Yakima at this time.  According to the OAG, Horizon Air, United Express and USAir were operating a combined total of 19 nonstop flights every weekday from Seattle/Tacoma to Yakima in late 1988.  However, USAir was no longer operating jet service into Yakima by the summer of 1989.

During the early and mid 1990s, both Horizon Air (on behalf of Alaska Airlines) and United Express (operated by WestAir Commuter Airlines on behalf of United Airlines) continued to serve Yakima primarily with nonstop flights operated with twin turboprop aircraft from Seattle/Tacoma with Horizon operating nonstop turboprop service from Portland, OR as well.  In the spring of 1995, Horizon Air was operating all of its nonstop flights from Seattle/Tacoma to Yakima with Dornier 328 propjets while United Express was operating all of its flights from SEA to the airport with British Aerospace BAe Jetstream 31 propjets.  By June 1999, Horizon Air was operating all of its flights to Seattle/Tacoma (SEA) with de Havilland Canada DHC-8 Dash 8 turboprops while United Express (operated by SkyWest Airlines on behalf of United Airlines) was operating all of its flights to SEA with Embraer EMB-120 Brasilia turboprops with a combined total of 16 daily nonstop flights operated by the two air carriers from the airport to Seattle/Tacoma at this time.

Facilities and aircraft

McAllister Field covers 825 acres (334 ha) at an elevation of 1,099 feet (335 m) above mean sea level. It has two asphalt runways: 9/27 is 7,604 by 150 feet (2,318 x 46 m) and 4/22 is 3,835 by 150 feet (1,169 x 46 m). The Yakima Air Terminal is equipped with a contract Air Traffic Control Tower, operated by SERCO under a contract with the FAA. The tower operates daily from 0600 to 2200.

In the year ending December 31, 2013, the airport had 35,351 aircraft operations, according to the FAA Terminal Area Forecast (TAF). The 35,351 total operations are broken out into two categories, Itinerant and Local Operations. Itinerant Operations include 1,764 Air Carrier, 3,187 Air Taxi and Commuter, 15,234 General Aviation, and 1,385 Military Operations. Local Operations include 12,569 Civil Operations and 1,212 Military Operations.

The airport is home to Cub Crafters, a manufacturer of light sport and light utility aircraft. The airport has one full-service fixed-base operator (FBO), McCormick Air Center, which provides hangar leasing, aircraft rental, flight instruction, and fuel. The airport has one aviation museum known as McAllister Air Museum.

Airlines and destinations

Passenger

Cargo

References

External links
 Yakima Air Terminal - McAllister Field, official site
 McAllister Field at WSDOT Aviation
 Aerial image as of July 1996 from USGS The National Map
 
 

Airports in Washington (state)
Yakima, Washington
Transportation buildings and structures in Yakima County, Washington
Airfields of the United States Army Air Forces in Washington (state)
USAAF Contract Flying School Airfields